Serafimovichsky District is an administrative district (raion), one of the thirty-three in Volgograd Oblast, Russia. As a municipal division, it is incorporated as Serafimovichsky Municipal District. It is located in the west of the oblast. Its administrative center is the town of Serafimovich. Population:  27,137 (2002 Census);  The population of Serafimovich accounts for 36.9% of the district's total population.

References

Notes

Sources

Districts of Volgograd Oblast